Maria Rosa Candido (10 February 1967 – 18 October 1993) was an Italian short track speed skater. She won the gold medal at the women's 3000 metre relay event at the 1988 Winter Olympics and bronze medal in individual 3000 metre relay. She competed in the women's 3000 metre relay event at the 1992 Winter Olympics.

References

External links
 

1967 births
1993 deaths
Italian female short track speed skaters
Olympic short track speed skaters of Italy
Short track speed skaters at the 1992 Winter Olympics
Sportspeople from the Province of Belluno
Olympic gold medalists for Italy
Olympic bronze medalists for Italy
Road incident deaths in Italy
20th-century Italian women